Ralph Thomas Gilleon (born March 14, 1942) is an American artist who is best known for his paintings of Tipis, Plains Indians, and Old West imagery. His work is unusual within the Western art genre for its modernist style, taking inspiration from artists such as Andy Warhol, Mark Rothko, and Edward Hopper.

Works 
Gilleon's paintings can be found in the permanent collections of the C.M. Russell Museum, the Booth Western Art Museum, Whitney Western Art Museum and Scottsdale's Museum of the West. His work is also included in large private collections such as the Tom Petrie collection, the Tim Peterson collection, the Erwin and Helga Haub collection, and the Patrick and Carol Hemingway collection.

Awards, honors, and membership 
 2009: Named feature artist of the Jackson Hole Fall Arts Festival.
 2012: Booth Western Art Museum hosted solo exhibit titled The Iconic West of R. Tom Gilleon. January 28 – May 27.
 2013: Gilleon was the first living artist to have a solo exhibit at the C.M. Russell Museum. Titled Let Icons Be Icons: The Art of R. Tom Gilleon. August 16 – December 28.
 2013: Gilleon's painting Hair Apparent broke the record sale price of any living artist at the Russell live auction when it sold for $225,000.
 2020 (upcoming): Scottsdale's Museum of the West will host a retrospective with works by Ken Riley and R. Tom Gilleon.
 Founding member of the C.M. Russell Skull Society of Artists.
 Member of the C.M. Russell Riders.
 Member of the Montana Painters Alliance.

References 

1942 births
Living people
University of Florida alumni
20th-century American painters
21st-century American painters
United States Navy sailors
Painters from Florida
People from Gainesville, Florida
Disney people
American illustrators